Zaharah Agus or Zara Agus (Zera Agus) is a Malay singer and actress, well known in Malaysia during the 1960s and 1970s.

Agus' best-known role was that of the first wife of P.Ramlee in the film Madu Tiga. In this film, Saloma made a cover of "Keindahan Bintang Malam" which was originally sung by Zera Agus. In the film, the song was shortened into Bintang Malam. The song "Mat Lodeh" which was popularized by Anita Sarawak was also originally performed by Zera Agus. The cover version by Anita in the 1970s was done with alternate lyrics.

Discography
Malaya Merdeka 
Mat Lodeh
Ikan Kekek
Kalau Mau Kenal
Tiang Agama
Mas Merah
Keindahan Bintang Malam (composed by Ahmad Nawab)
Saya Cemburu

Filmography

Film

References

Year of birth missing (living people)
Living people
Malaysian people of Malay descent
20th-century Malaysian women singers
Malaysian film actresses
Malay-language singers
20th-century Malaysian actresses
Malay Film Productions contract players